Kucherovka is a rural locality (a selo) in Masalsky Selsoviet, Loktevsky District, Altai Krai, Russia. The population was 71 as of 2013. There is 1 street.

Geography 
Kucherovka is located 36 km southeast of Gornyak (the district's administrative centre) by road. Masalsky is the nearest rural locality.

References 

Rural localities in Loktevsky District